The Edmond & Lily Safra Center for Ethics is a research center at Harvard Kennedy School at Harvard University in Cambridge, Massachusetts. The center's mission is to "advance teaching and research on ethical issues in public life." It is named for Edmond J. Safra and has been supported by Lily Safra and the Edmond J. Safra Foundation. The Center for Ethics was the first Interfaculty Initiative at Harvard University.

The center has four categories of Fellowships: Undergraduate Fellows, directed by Arthur Applbaum; Graduate Fellows, co-directed by Mathias Risse and Meira Levinson; Fellows-in-Residence; and Ethics Pedagogy Fellows, directed by Christopher Robichaud. In 2016, the center entered into a partnership with the Berggruen Institute's Philosophy and Culture Center, as a partner institution for the Berggruen Fellowship Program. The Philosophy and Culture Center supports three Berggruen Fellows each year. Berggruen Fellows engage in scholarship of broad social and political importance from cross-cultural perspectives, and demonstrate a commitment to the public dissemination of their ideas.

Founded by Dennis Thompson as the Program in Ethics and the Professions in 1986, the center has supported the work of more than 800 fellows and visiting scholars, many of whom have spent a year or more at the center. They include professors, graduate students, and undergraduates, journalists, physicians, lawyers, psychologists from many educational institutions and governments in the United States and throughout the world.

The center does not promote a particular theory or conception of ethics or morality but rather encourages rigorous study of difficult ethical issues, informed by empirical research and philosophical analysis. Although the range of topics studied by fellows range widely, major themes have included professional ethics, institutional corruption, “Diversity, Justice and Democracy,” and "Political Economy and Justice."

Faculty
The current director of the center is Danielle Allen, who was appointed in 2015. She succeeded Lawrence Lessig, who served from 2009 to 2015. Dennis Thompson, appointed by President Derek Bok in 1986, is the founding director. The center's Faculty Committee comprises Arthur Applbaum, Eric Beerbohm, Jeff Behrends, Selim Berker, I. Glenn Cohen, Angela Depace, Richard H. Fallon, Jr., Archon Fung, Nien-Hê Hsieh, David S. Jones, Meira Levinson, Mathias Risse, Christopher Robichaud, Gina Schouten, Tommie Shelby, Alison Simmons, Lucas Stanczyk, Brandon Terry, and Robert D. Truog.

Harvard faculty who were key contributors to the center include John Rawls, Kenneth Ryan, Amartya Sen, Thomas Scanlon, Martha Minow and Michael Sandel. More than 50 Harvard faculty from all the schools at the university have been active in the center.

History
Harvard President Derek Bok argued that there was a pressing need for "problem-oriented courses in ethics" that would prepare students for the moral dilemmas and ethical decisions they would face throughout their careers. By his own account, he could not make much progress on meeting this need until he recruited Dennis Thompson, then a professor at Princeton, to come to Harvard to start a new program.

With its decentralized structure, Harvard was not friendly to inter-faculty initiatives, but with the support of key faculty and several deans, Thompson created what was then called the Program in Ethics and the Professions. It was Harvard's first major inter-faculty initiative. In 1990, a graduate fellows program was established, led by Arthur Applbaum, a fellow in the first class and now a professor of ethics at the Harvard Kennedy School.

Thompson worked with Bok, and subsequent Harvard Presidents Neil Rudenstine and Lawrence Summers, to raise funds to support the growing activities of the ethics effort. The program grew into a center, and now has an endowment worth more than $55 million. The major benefactors are the Edmond J. Safra Foundation and the estate of Lester Kissel. Others include Eugene P. Beard and the American Express Foundation.

Commenting on the center after 20 years, Bok observed, "One of the best new developments in professional education is the wide and growing interest in resolving problems of ethics. Harvard’s Center was instrumental in this effort, and it has exceeded even my own optimistic expectations."

When Thompson stepped down after 20 years as director, Lawrence Lessig, a prominent scholar of Internet law at Stanford, was appointed to lead the center. He had been a fellow in the center in 1996-97 where he developed his ideas on Internet law. As director, Lessig led the center in a campaign against institutional corruption (also a theme in the early work of the center). He took the campaign to the public, and ran for President of the U.S. in 2015. In 2011, the center announced a partnership with InnoCentive "seeking innovative systems to monitor institutions for potential signs of corrupting forces."

After Lessig resigned in 2015, President Drew Faust launched another national search, which resulted in the appointment of Danielle Allen, a political theorist at the Institute for Advanced Study at Princeton. Her vision "melds the program from the Thompson era and that of the Lessig era" into a larger endeavor to "create a body of work targeted at real world problems that will be worthy of broad dissemination and will support innovation in practical efforts to solve problems of public and professional ethics."

Notable fellows and alumni
 Solomon Benatar, founding director, University of Cape Town Bioethics Centre, and formerly Head, Department of Medicine, UCT and Groote Schuur Hospital
 Rajeev Bhargava, former Director of Centre for the Study of Developing Societies, New Delhi
 Troy Brennan, Executive Vice President and Chief Medical Officer, CVS Health
 Ezekiel Emanuel, founding chair of Department of Bioethics, National Institutes of Health, now Chair of the Department of Medical Ethics and Health Policy at the University of Pennsylvania.
 Heather Gerken, legal adviser to Obama campaign in 2008 and 2012, and Professor of Law, Yale University
 Amy Gutmann, founder of Princeton University Center for Human Values, now President of University of Pennsylvania
 Chris Hayes, political commentator and TV show host on MSNBC 
 Elizabeth Kiss, founder of Kenan Institute for Ethics, Duke University, eighth President of Agnes Scott College and now Warden of Rhodes House, Oxford
 Lisa Lehman, Executive Director, National Center for Ethics in Health Care, US Department of Veterans Affairs
 Sanford Levinson, well known constitutional commentator, Professor of Law, University of Texas
 Robert Massie, Episcopal priest, politician, author, and environmental activist, and former candidate for Lieutenant Governor in Massachusetts
 Jerry Menikoff, Director, Office for Human Research Protections, Department of Health and Human Services
 Michael Morisy, founder of Muckrock.com, a service that allows people file, track, and share FOIA requests
 Samuel Moyn (Berggruen Fellow), Jeremiah Smith, Jr. Professor of Law at Harvard Law School
 Richard Pildes, NBC and ABC commentator on elections, and professor of law, New York University
 Samantha Power, U.S. Ambassador to the United Nations
 Jedediah Purdy, author and professor of law at Duke University
 Angela Smith, founding Director of the Roger Mudd Center for Ethics, Washington and Lee University.
 Aaron Swartz, internet activist who committed suicide in 2013 while under federal indictment for alleged computer crimes connected to downloading a large academic journal archive.
 Yael Tamir, former Minister of Education in Israeli government
 Melissa Williams, founder of Centre for Ethics, University of Toronto

References

External links
Official website
"Ethics in Practice", Harvard Magazine, May-June 2007

1986 establishments in Massachusetts
Ethics organizations
Harvard University research institutes